Kortenaer may refer to:

 Egbert Bartholomeusz Kortenaer (1604–1665), admiral of the United Provinces of the Netherlands
 HNLMS Kortenaer, for ships named after the admiral
 Kortenaer-class frigate, a class of frigates of the Royal Netherlands Navy